Patella ulyssiponensis, common name the rough limpet, or China limpet is a species of sea snail, a true limpet, a marine gastropod mollusk in the family Patellidae, one of the families of true limpets. Despite its common name, the China limpet is found throughout the Eastern North Atlantic and the Mediterranean.

Compared with the common limpet, Patella vulgata, the rough limpet has a similar shell (maximum size 50mm long x 40 mm wide x 20 mm high, apex closer to the front of the animal/ anterior than to the back/ posterior) but with radiating ridges that are finer and which alternate 1-ridge/ 3-ridges around the shell in a distinct pattern.  The interior of the shell is often tinged orange towards its apex.  The foot is a cream-orange color, and the dozens of pallial tentacles are translucent and colorless, arranged in two series of different sizes.  No other characteristics of body structure or shell morphology distinguish it from P. vulgata, to which it is otherwise identical.

Etymology
Patella ulyssiponensis can be divided into the Latin words Patella, meaning "little pan", and ulyssiponensis, meaning "from Lisbon".

Description

Distribution
Patella ulyssiponensis is found in the European Atlantic area north to the North Sea and also in the Mediterranean.

Uses 
In Madeira Island in Portugal, Patella ulyssiponensis, known locally as Lapa, is eaten after cooking in a pan with garlic and lemon juice.

References

 Gmelin, J.F. (1791) Vermes. In Gmelin J.F. (Ed.) Caroli a Linnaei Systema Naturae per Regna Tria Naturae, Editio Decima Tertia, Aucta Reformata. Tome 1, Pars 6 (Vermes). G.E. Beer, Lipsiae [Leipzig], pp. 3021–3910

External links

Patellidae
Marine molluscs of Asia
Taxa named by Johann Friedrich Gmelin
Gastropods described in 1791